Max Algop Maxudian (12 June 1881 – 20 July 1976) was a French stage and film actor.

Born in the Ottoman Empire to an Armenian family, Max Maxudian emigrated to France with his parents in 1893 at the age of twelve. Maxudian became a famous theater actor in his adopted country, appearing at the Odéon and at the Grand Guignol. He died at age 95 in 1976 in Boulogne-Billancourt, Hauts-de-Seine, France.

Selected filmography
 Les Amours de la reine Élisabeth (1912)
 Infatuation (1918)
 Possession (1922)
 The Gardens of Murcia (1923)
 La Roue (1923)
 The Loves of Rocambole (1924)
 The Arab (1924)
 The Promised Land (1925)
 Napoléon (1927)
 Nile Water (1928)
 Venus (1929)
 La Maison de la Fléche (1930)
 Venetian Nights (1931)
 Shadows of Paris (1932)
 The Faceless Voice (1933)
 Les yeux noirs (1935)
 The Decoy (1935)
 The Two Girls (1936)
 Wells in Flames (1937)
 White Cargo (1937)
 Three Waltzes (1938)
 Devil in the Flesh (1947)

Bibliography
 Jung, Uli & Schatzberg, Walter. Beyond Caligari: The Films of Robert Wiene. Berghahn Books, 1999.

External links
Max Maxudian's biography

1881 births
1976 deaths
French male film actors
French male silent film actors
French male stage actors
People from İzmir
Smyrniote Armenians
Armenians from the Ottoman Empire
Emigrants from the Ottoman Empire to France
French people of Armenian descent
20th-century French male actors